The 2010 Aberto de São Paulo was a professional tennis tournament played on outdoor hard courts. It was part of the 2010 ATP Challenger Tour. It took place in São Paulo, Brazil between 3 and 10 January 2010.

ATP entrants

Seeds

 Rankings are as of December 28, 2009

Other entrants
The following players received wildcards into the singles main draw:
  Marcelo Demoliner
  Leonardo Kirche
  Tiago Lopes
  Fernando Romboli

The following players received entry from the qualifying draw:
  Ričardas Berankis
  Michael McClune
  Guillermo Olaso
  Caio Zampieri

Champions

Singles

 Ricardo Mello def.  Eduardo Schwank, 6–3, 6–1

Doubles

 Brian Dabul /  Sebastián Prieto  def.  Tomasz Bednarek /  Mateusz Kowalczyk, 6–3, 6–3

External links

Prime Cup Aberto de Sao Paulo
Tennis tournaments in Brazil
Aberto de São Paulo
Prime Cup Aberto de São Paulo
Prime Cup Aberto de São Paulo